Ipswich State High School is a state secondary school in the suburb of Brassall, Ipswich, Queensland, Australia, established in 1963, On the site of the original Brassall State High School. Simon Riley is the current principal since 2005. The biggest high school in Ipswich has approximately 2 thousand students currently attending as of May 2021.

History (Before and 1960's) 
The Ipswich State High School originally came from a site in the main heart of the Ipswich (suburb), Queensland, inside The Queen Victoria Silver Jubilee Memorial Technical College before moving into the Brassall site in 1963. They were called "Ipswich State High School And Technical College". The School, while transportation, was called Brassall State High School in 1962. The Technical College remained at the original site until it was merched and moved into what is now know today as The Bremer Institute of TAFE. The School in 1962 originally had 4 main buildings, called "A", "B", "C" and "D". Brassall State High School Originally had 8 - 10 staff for the new site, while Ipswich State High School had up to 35 staff in 1963. Brassall State High School introduced a new group of important students called the Student Representative Council, which is still functions to this day.

History (1970's - 2010's) 
Research is still operating for This Section as footage is rare due to the 1974 Brisbane flood and 2010–11 Queensland floods, impacting records of some years from the school's library and staff rooms.

Notable former students
Allan Langer, NRL football player
Ronaldo Mulitalo, NRL football player
Phillip Sami, NRL football player
Treymain Spry, NRL football player
Robert Lowe Hall, British Government's chief economic advisor

References

External links
Official site

Educational institutions established in 1963
Public high schools in Queensland
Schools in Ipswich, Queensland
1963 establishments in Australia